António Duarte Arnaut, GOL (28 January 1936 – 21 May 2018) was a Portuguese poet, fiction writer, essayist, lawyer, and politician. He was Minister of Social Affairs in the second  Constitutional Portuguese Government, led by Mário Soares. He is considered the "father" of the Portuguese national health service (SNS - Serviço Nacional de Saúde, em Português), having created the first basic health law in Portugal and contributed to universal access to medical care for all Portuguese.

Life before politics 

António Arnaut was born in Cumeeira, a small town located in Penela Municipality. He graduated in law from University of Coimbra in 1959.

Political career 

In 1973, together with personalities like Mário Soares or Salgado Zenha, he founded Socialist Party, in Bad Münstereifel, Germany. He was a member of the party board until 1983.

In 1975 he was elected to the Constituent Assembly, which had the task of drafting the new Constitution after the Carnation Revolution. He was also elected to the Assembly of the Republic for several times.

In 1978 he was sworn in as Minister of Social Affairs, and despite being in office for only seven months, he founded the Portuguese National Health Service, which created the first universal health system in Portugal.

Although being retired from active politics, António Arnaut was still an influential voice in the country.

Other activities 

He was President of the Portuguese Bar Association council in Coimbra District.

He was a freemason, and was Grand Master of Grande Oriente Lusitano between 2002 and 2005.

References 

1936 births
2018 deaths
People from Penela
Socialist Party (Portugal) politicians
Government ministers of Portugal
Members of the Assembly of the Republic (Portugal)
Portuguese male writers
Portuguese Freemasons
University of Coimbra alumni